The Owatonna Public Library is a public library in Owatonna, Minnesota, United States.  It was established in 1896 and is housed in a building completed in 1900.  It is a member of Southeastern Libraries Cooperating (SELCO), the regional public library system for Southeast Minnesota.

History
Owatonna's public library was established in 1896 by a legacy donation of $5,000 from an Owatonna citizen.  Votes passed in 1898 and 1899 to provide public funds for the construction of a dedicated library building.  Frank A. Gutterson of Smith and Gutterson—an architectural firm based in Des Moines, Iowa—designed a two-story, cruciform facility in Neoclassical style.  Construction began in 1899 and the library building was officially dedicated on February 22, 1900.

The Owatonna Public Library building was listed on the National Register of Historic Places in 1976 as the Owatonna Free Public Library for having local significance in the themes of architecture and education.  It was nominated for its Neoclassical architecture and contributions to Owatonna's intellectual and cultural development.

See also
 National Register of Historic Places listings in Steele County, Minnesota

References

External links
 Owatonna Public Library

1896 establishments in Minnesota
Buildings and structures in Steele County, Minnesota
Education in Steele County, Minnesota
Libraries on the National Register of Historic Places in Minnesota
Library buildings completed in 1900
National Register of Historic Places in Steele County, Minnesota
Neoclassical architecture in Minnesota
Southeastern Libraries Cooperating